Phycodes radiata is a moth in the family Brachodidae. It was described by Ochsenheimer in 1808. It is found in Pakistan, Afghanistan, Nepal, India and Sri Lanka.

References

Natural History Museum Lepidoptera generic names catalog

Brachodidae
Moths described in 1808